List of mayors of Jeffersonville, Indiana is a list from the first mayor to the current mayor of the city.

History
Jeffersonville was founded in 1802 and was run by trustees until 1839 in which Dr. Nathaniel Field, a state legislator and trustee of Jeffersonville, secured legislation to make Jeffersonville a city. In April of that year the first mayor would be elected. The position would be a part-time position until 1964 with Mayor Richard Vissing becoming the first full-time mayor.

List

Referenced from the Encyclopedia of Louisville.

References

Jeffersonville
Jeffersonville, Mayors